The Budd Universal Transit Vehicle is an electric multiple unit heavy rail car built for use on the Baltimore Metro SubwayLink and Miami-Dade Metrorail systems. They were built by the Budd Company (under the name Transit America) from 1983 to 1986, and were the last cars ever built by Budd before the company shuttered its railcar manufacturing business.

Description

The Universal Transit Vehicle was manufactured by the Budd Company at their Red Lion plant in Northeast Philadelphia. The appearance of cars on the SubwayLink are identical to those on the Metrorail (and vice versa), as the two agencies built their systems at the same time and saved money by sharing a single order.

Trains draw power from the electric third rail. Each car can hold up to 166 passengers (76 seated, 90 standing). Cars are semi-permanently attached in married pairs, and are arranged as 4-car trains on the Metrorail. The trains on the SubwayLink are arranged as 2-, 4- and 6-car consists.

The SubwayLink fleet had a significant overhaul between 2002 and 2005. Seats were reupholstered, and the floors were replaced. External destination rollsigns were replaced with LED displays; internal systems that display train destinations and upcoming stop announcements were also installed. There was a planned refurbishment for the cars on the Metrorail, but later it was decided to purchase new cars after it was found that the fleet was never maintained properly.

Replacement
Because of the improper maintenance of the Metrorail cars, Miami-Dade announced a $313 million purchase of 136 new Metrorail cars from Hitachi Rail Italy (formerly AnsaldoBreda) in November 2012. The first new trainset entered service in early December 2017.

In July 2017, the Maryland Transit Administration announced the purchase of 78 new railcars from Hitachi Rail Italy to replace the entire SubwayLink fleet. The cars will be similar in appearance to those purchased for the Miami Metrorail.

See also
Breda A650 - A similar fleet operated by the Los Angeles County Metro Rail on their B and D Lines.

References

Budd multiple units
Train-related introductions in 1983
Baltimore Metro SubwayLink
Electric multiple units of the United States
750 V DC multiple units